Brie de Meaux is a French brie cheese of the Brie region and a designated AOC product since 1980. Its name comes from the town of Meaux in the Brie region. As of 2003, 6,774 tonnes (-13.4% since 1998) were produced annually.

Description
It has a soft, delicate white rind. The interior of the cheese is straw-yellow, creamy and soft.

History
A modern legend identifies as Brie de Meaux a certain cheese dating to the seventh century, "rich and creamy", with an edible white rind that in the 774 AD Frankish Emperor Charlemagne first tasted in the company of a bishop and approved, requiring two cartloads to be sent to Aachen annually; the site, not mentioned in the anecdotal but unreliable ninth-century life of Charlemagne, De Carolo Magno by Notker the Stammerer,  has become associated with the monastery traditionally founded by Rado in Reuil-en-Brie.

This cheese was named the "king of cheeses" in 1815 by Talleyrand at the Congress of Vienna.

Manufacturing

The production territory of Brie de Meaux is limited to the departments of Seine-et-Marne, Loiret, Meuse, Aube, Marne, Haute-Marne and the Yonne. There is, however, no production close to Meaux, and there is little celebration of the cheese in the town.

Brie de Meaux is made with raw cow's milk. The fermented milk is placed in a tank for 16 hours, then put in bowl for curding which lasts one hour. It is then cut into small cubes with a slice-curd. Finally, it is molded by hand by thin layers with a brie shovel. It is then drained on mats made of reeds. The next day, the cheese is then salted and they will then remain in the curing room for two days. It must wait 3 weeks minimum, typically 6 to 8 weeks to reach full maturity. Throughout the ripening period, cheeses are routinely turned by hand. The time of manufacture of Brie de Meaux is two months.

See also
 List of cheeses

References

Cheeses with designation of origin protected in the European Union
Cow's-milk cheeses
French cheeses
French products with protected designation of origin